Kouame Chérif Quenum (born 5 June 1993) is a French professional footballer who plays as a fullback.

Professional career
After a steady progression in the lower leagues of France, Quenum signed for Valenciennes FC in Ligue 2 in June 2017. He made his professional debut for Valenciennes in a 4–3 Ligue 2 win over US Orléans on 29 September 2017. In January 2019, he was loaned to Stade Bordelais until the end of the season.

Personal life
Quenum is of Ivorian descent.

References

External links
 
 
 
 Valenciennes Profile
 Avranche Profile

1993 births
Living people
Footballers from Orléans
Association football defenders
French footballers
French sportspeople of Ivorian descent
Valenciennes FC players
US Avranches players
Stade Bordelais (football) players
Bourges 18 players
Ligue 2 players
Championnat National players
Championnat National 2 players
Championnat National 3 players